Diana Rosemary Lennon   (1949 – 15 May 2018) was a New Zealand academic and pediatrician, specialising in infectious diseases, and was a full professor at the University of Auckland.

Academic career 
Lennon graduated with a Bachelor of Medicine, Bachelor of Surgery from the University of Otago in 1972. She was awarded FRACP in Pediatrics in 1978.

After a short research position at the University of Auckland, Lennon trained further in infectious diseases at the University of California, Los Angeles. In 1982 she returned to New Zealand as a Senior Lecturer at the University of Auckland, with a half-time role as a specialist pediatrician at the Auckland Hospital Board.

She was promoted to Associate Professor in 1991, and Professor of Population Child and Youth Health in 1996. 

Lennon was a specialist in pediatric infectious diseases at Princess Mary Hospital, Starship Hospital and Middlemore Hospital in Auckland, and provided consultant services throughout the country.

Research 
Lennon's work on rheumatic fever began in the 1980s with the setting up of a rheumatic fever register for the Auckland region, which was followed by free delivery of a penicillin-based treatment to prevent resurgence. In 2006 Lennon was co-author on New Zealand's first evidence-based diagnostic and treatment guidelines for rheumatic fever. In 2017 Lennon published the results of a world-first trial showing that community interventions (sore-throat clinics in primary schools) could significantly reduce the rate of rheumatic fever in school-children.

Lennon also worked on prevention of other infectious diseases in children. Her work was instrumental in the introduction of vaccine programmes for Haemophilus influenzae type b and meningococcal A and B. Her work showing that the greatest risk factor for meningococcal disease is crowding led directly to changes in how state homes are built.

Awards 
In 1992 Lennon was named Plunket Woman of the Year. Lennon was made a Fellow of the Infectious Diseases Society of America in 1994.  

She became an Officer of the New Zealand Order of Merit in 2005 for services to science and health. In 2008 the Royal Society Te Apārangi awarded her one of two inaugural Dame Joan Metge Medals for her "research as a paediatrician scientist [that] has made a major impact on the lives of New Zealand children".

In 2017 Lennon was featured in the Royal Society Te Apārangi's 150 women in 150 words project, celebrating the contributions of women to knowledge in New Zealand.

Selected works

References

External links
   

New Zealand women academics
New Zealand paediatricians
1949 births
2018 deaths